Jahan Nama Palace is a Palace in Farahabad, Mazandaran province and is part of the Farahabad Complex. The Palace was built during the Abbas the Great period and was destroyed by the Kazakhs.

References 

Palaces in Iran
Safavid architecture